Robert Edward Douglas II (born July 25, 1982) is a former American football fullback who played for the New York Giants in the National Football League. He played college football at the University of Memphis.

Professional career
Douglas was not selected in the 2005 NFL Draft. The Tennessee Titans signed him as a free agent on April 27, 2005 and to the practice squad on September 4, 2005. Douglas missed training camp due to an injury. The Titans waived Douglas on November 1, 2005. On December 20, 2005, Douglas signed with the Houston Texans practice squad.

On January 12, 2006, the Tampa Bay Buccaneers signed Douglas to a future/reserve contract. The team waived Douglas on July 24, 2006 to make room on the roster to sign quarterback Bruce Gradkowski. The New York Giants signed Douglas on August 15, 2006 then waived him on August 28. Douglas then signed with the Houston Texans and was on the practice squad until being waived on September 12, 2006. Douglas then signed with AFL team Kansas City Brigade on November 28, 2006 and was waived on March 14, 2007 before the season. While signed with the Brigade, Douglas entered "other league exempt" status, after the New York Giants signed Douglas to the practice squad on December 26, 2006.

At training camp, Douglas was the only fullback on the roster. Douglas played in only one NFL regular season game in his career, on September 23, 2007. He sat out the rest of the season due to a knee injury. The Giants won Super Bowl XLII after the season.

The Giants waived Douglas on August 30, 2008.

Personal life
Robert has a child in northern New Jersey. He currently lives in northeastern New Jersey.

References

1982 births
Living people
African-American players of American football
American football fullbacks
Memphis Tigers football players
Tennessee Titans players
Houston Texans players
Tampa Bay Buccaneers players
New York Giants players
Players of American football from St. Louis
21st-century African-American sportspeople
20th-century African-American people